Alice Marie Johnson (born May 30, 1955) is an American criminal justice reform advocate and former federal prisoner. She was convicted in 1996 for her involvement in a Memphis cocaine trafficking organization and sentenced to life imprisonment. In June 2018, after serving 21 years in prison, she was released from the Federal Correctional Institution, Aliceville, after the 45th President of the United States, Donald Trump, exercised executive powers to grant clemency, thereby commuting her sentence, effective immediately.

Early life, crime, and sentence
Johnson was born in Mississippi, and her memoirs recount growing up as one of nine children of sharecroppers, becoming pregnant as a sophomore in high school, and later working as a secretary. At the time of her arrest, she was a single mother of five children.

Johnson told Mic in 2017 that she had become involved in the drug trade after she had lost her job at FedEx, where she had worked for ten years, due to a gambling addiction; this was followed by a divorce and the loss of her youngest son in a motorcycle accident. She filed for bankruptcy in 1991, and foreclosure of her house followed.

Johnson was arrested in 1993 and convicted in 1996 of eight federal criminal counts relating to her involvement in a Memphis, Tennessee-based cocaine trafficking organization. In addition to drug conspiracy counts, she was convicted of money laundering and structuring, the latter crime because of her purchase of a house with a down payment structured to avoid hitting a $10,000 reporting threshold. The Memphis operation involved over a dozen individuals. The indictment, which named 16 defendants, described her as a leader in a multi-million dollar cocaine ring, and detailed dozens of drug transactions and deliveries. Evidence presented at trial showed that the Memphis operation was connected to Colombian drug dealers based in Texas. She was sentenced to life imprisonment without parole in 1997. At the sentencing hearing, U.S. District Judge Julia Gibbons said that Johnson was "the quintessential entrepreneur" in an operation that dealt in 2,000 to 3,000 kilograms of cocaine, with a "very significant" impact on the community. Co-defendants Curtis McDonald and Jerlean McNeil were sentenced to life and 19 years in federal prison, respectively. A number of other co-defendants who testified against Johnson received sentences between probation and 10 years. Following her conviction, Johnson acknowledged that she was an intermediary in the drug trafficking organization, but said she did not actually make deals or sell drugs.

Imprisonment
Johnson became a grandmother and great-grandmother while imprisoned. She exhibited good behavior in prison. In a memoir written after her release, she wrote that she served time at the Federal Medical Center, Carswell, the federal prison hospital in Texas, where she became a certified hospice worker, and was subsequently transferred to FCI Aliceville to be closer to family. In letters supporting her bid for clemency, staff members at FCI Aliceville wrote that Johnson did not commit any disciplinary infractions during her incarceration at FCI Aliceville. Johnson participated in a pilot program, introduced in 2016 by Deputy Attorney General Sally Yates, that provided videoconferencing access to certain female federal prisoners. The program allowed the online publication Mic to record a video interview with her that went viral and brought her case to public attention. She also used Skype while imprisoned to speak at Hunter College, Yale, and other audiences. During her time in prison, she became an ordained minister, and credited her grant of clemency to divine intervention.

Commutation and pardon

A campaign in support of her release was launched by the American Civil Liberties Union and the website Mic; activists who supported her release argued that the punishment was excessive and an example of disproportionate impacts on African Americans. A number of individuals and organizations supported Johnson's bid for clemency, including U.S. Representatives Steve Cohen, Bennie Thompson, and Marc Veasey, law professors Marc Morjé Howard and Shon Hopwood, and Orange is the New Black author Piper Kerman. According to her lawyer Shawn Holley, the warden supported her release.

Johnson's was one of the 16,776 petitions filed in the Obama administration's 2014 clemency project. In 2016, she wrote an op-ed for CNN asking for forgiveness and a second chance. Her application was denied just before Obama left office. In 2018, Kim Kardashian and President Donald Trump's son-in-law Jared Kushner sought to persuade Trump to grant clemency to Johnson. In late May 2018, Kardashian met with the President in the Oval Office to urge him to pardon Johnson. On June 6, 2018, following Kardashian's appeal, Trump commuted Johnson's sentence, and Johnson was released. The commutation was one of a series of acts of clemency made by Trump in a "few high-profile cases brought to him by associates and allies." The Washington Posts Wonkblog described the pardon as somewhat surprising given Trump's past statements in favor of executing drug dealers.

When Trump delivered his State of the Union address on February 5, 2019, Johnson was a guest of the president. Trump asked her to stand up to be recognized, and she received a standing ovation from members of Congress. On August 28, 2020—one day after Johnson spoke at the 2020 Republican National Convention—Trump granted her a full pardon.

Memoir and activism
Since her release, Johnson has become an advocate for criminal justice reform in the United States, often invoking her personal experience. The month after her release, in July 2018, she called for an end to mandatory sentencing. In September 2019, she met with Governor Bill Lee of Tennessee to promote greater access to expungement and prisoner education and reduction in barriers to reentry, and to express concerns about the cash bail system.

Johnson also advocates for the inclusion of female voices in the conversation around criminal justice reform. Ahead of International Women's Day 2019, UN Women featured her story as part of its "Courage to Question" series.
 	
In May 2019, memoirs written by Johnson with Nancy French, entitled After Life: My Journey From Incarceration To Freedom, were published by HarperCollins, with a foreword written by Kim Kardashian. A Kirkus review of the autobiography described the work as "A moving, inspirational story that makes a powerful argument for sentencing reform."

In the final days of the Donald Trump presidency in 2020, Lyn Ulbricht—mother of Ross Ulbricht—mentioned that she was seeking clemency for her son Ross Ulbricht from the United States president at the time, Donald Trump. Lyn Ulbricht stated that she had the support of numerous signatories, including Alice Marie Johnson.

See also
List of people granted executive clemency by Donald Trump
Ross Ulbricht – sentenced to life in prison, still seeking clemency as of 2023, supported by Alice Marie Johnson

References

External links

1955 births
Living people
American people convicted of drug offenses
American women memoirists
American memoirists
People from Memphis, Tennessee
People convicted of money laundering
Presidency of Donald Trump
Prisoners sentenced to life imprisonment by the United States federal government
Recipients of American presidential clemency
Recipients of American presidential pardons
21st-century American women